The 2011 European F3 Open Championship was the third European F3 Open Championship season. The season began on 17 April at Circuit Ricardo Tormo in Valencia, and finished on 30 October at Circuit de Catalunya in Montmeló after 16 races run at eight meetings, three held in Spain, as well as meetings held in Belgium, France, the United Kingdom, Portugal, and Italy.

Teams and drivers
 All cars are powered by Toyota engines. Main class powered by Dallara F308, while Copa Class by Dallara F306 chassis.

Race calendar and results
 An eight-race provisional calendar was announced on 12 December 2010. On 19 January 2011, it was announced that the Nürburgring round will be cancelled and will be replaced by an event in Portimão.

Championship standings

Overall
With a driver's best 14 scores counting towards the championship, points were awarded as follows:

Copa F306/300
With a driver's best 14 scores counting towards the championship, points were awarded for both races as follows:

Teams
 Points for each team's two best scoring cars were awarded for both races as follows:

References

External links
 European F3 Open Official Website

European
Euroformula Open Championship seasons
Formula Three
Euroformula Open